Christopher Neville Eaton (born 16 September 1958) is a British Contemporary Christian singer-songwriter, who has written songs for singers including Cliff Richard, Amy Grant and Jaci Velasquez.

Career
Born in Sedgley, Staffordshire, Eaton was a member of the 1980s bands Lyrix and the Mark Williamson Band prior to his solo career. He has toured the US to promote his albums, and also toured Europe as opening act for Art Garfunkel in 1998. He worked on Roger Daltrey's 1987 solo album Can't Wait to See the Movie, singing backing vocals.

Eaton wrote Cliff Richard's 1990 UK Christmas No. 1 single "Saviour's Day" and has also written songs that have been performed by other CCM artists such as Amy Grant, who recorded a version of Eaton's "Breath of Heaven". He also wrote several Jaci Velasquez songs including "On My Knees" and "God So Loved" as well as producing two albums.

Personal life
Eaton married singer songwriter Abby Scott in May 2009. He had been previously married to Gill, but the marriage ended in 1990.

Discography

Albums
 1986: Vision
 1995: Wonderful World
 1997: Cruisin (released in North America as What Kind of Love)
 2008: Dare to Dream

Songs recorded by other artists
Eaton has composed many songs recorded by other artists for their albums. Below is a small selection of these:Cliff Richard 1981: Wired for Sound "Lost in a Lonely World" and "Summer Rain"
 1982: Now You See Me, Now You Don't "Where Do We Go from Here"*, "Little Town"* (rearrangement of "O Little Town of Bethlehem") and "Discovering"
 1987: Always Guaranteed "Under Your Spell"
 1989: Stronger "Joanna"
 1990: From a Distance: The Event "Saviour's Day"* and "All the Time You Need"
 2001: Wanted "Let Me Be the One"*
 2003: Cliff at Christmas "Santa's List"*
 2004: Something's Goin' On "For Life", "I Don't Wanna Lose You" and "Faithful One"
 2015: 75 at 75 "Golden"*
 2018: Rise Up "Reborn"*
 2020: Music... The Air That I Breathe "Falling for You"*

 2022: Christmas with Cliff "Six Days After Christmas (Happy New Year)"Amy Grant 1985: Unguarded "Sharayah"
 1992: Home for Christmas "Breath of Heaven"* and "Emmanuel, God With Us"
 1991: Heart in Motion "Hats"Jaci Velasquez 1996: Heavenly Place "On My Knees"
 1998: Jaci Velasquez (self-titled album) "God So Loved"*Michael English 1991: Michael English "Do You Believe in Love"Russ Taff 1985: Medals "Here I Am," "How Much It Hurts" and "Vision"
 1987: Russ Taff "Believe in Love"Rachael Lampa 2000: Live for You "Live for You"*Diamond Rio 2009: The Reason "Into Your Hands" and "Just Love"The Imperials 1985: Let the Wind Blow "In the Promised Land"
 1987: This Year's Model "Outlander" and "Warriors"Military Voices 2014: "1914 – The Christmas Truce"* (feat. Abby Scott, Flt Lt Matt Little, the Raf Spitfire Choir & William Inscoe)(Sheena Easton)'
1995:  (album My Cherie) – Dance away the blues  

Note: * denotes songs released as singles

References

External links 
 

1958 births
English Christians
Christian music songwriters
English songwriters
Living people
People from Sedgley
British performers of Christian music